The Kingdom of Nuwakot was a petty kingdom in the confederation of 24 states known as Chaubisi Rajya.

References 

Chaubisi Rajya
Nuwakot
Nuwakot
History of Nepal
Nuwakot